The Georgia House of Representatives is the lower house of the Georgia General Assembly (the state legislature) of the U.S. state of Georgia. There are currently 180 elected members. Republicans have had a majority in the chamber since 2005. The current House Speaker is Jon G. Burns.

History
The Georgia House of Representatives was created in  during the American Revolution, making it older than the U.S. Congress. During its existence, its meeting place has moved multiple times, from Savannah to Augusta, to Louisville, to Milledgeville and finally to Atlanta in 1868.

In 1867, the military governor of Georgia called for an assembly in Atlanta to discuss a constitutional convention. Atlanta officials moved to make the city Georgia's new state capital, donating the location of Atlanta's first city hall. The constitutional convention agreed and the people voted to ratify the decision on April 20, 1868. The Georgia General Assembly first presided in Atlanta on July 4, 1868.

On October 26, 1884, construction began on a new state capitol and was first occupied on June 15, 1889.

Powers and privileges
The state constitution gives the state legislature the power to make state laws, restrict land use to protect and preserve the environment and natural resources, form a state militia under the command of the Governor of Georgia, expend public money, condemn property, zone property, participate in tourism, and control and regulate outdoor advertising.

The state legislature cannot grant incorporation to private persons but may establish laws governing the incorporation process. It is also prohibited from authorizing contracts or agreements that may have the effect of or the intent of lessening competition or encouraging a monopoly.

Privileges
Members of the Georgia House of Representatives maintain two privileges during their time in office. First, no member can be arrested during session or during committee meetings except in cases of treason, felony, or "breach of the peace". Second, members are not liable for anything they might say in session or committee meetings.

Composition

According to the state constitution of 1983, this body is to comprise no fewer than 180 members elected for two-year terms. Current state law provides for 180 members. Elections are held the first Tuesday after the first Monday in November in even-numbered years.

It is the third-largest lower house of the 50 United States (behind New Hampshire (400) and Pennsylvania (203)). Republicans currently have a majority, though Democrats have gained seats in recent elections.
 
As of 2011, attorneys account for about 16.1% of the membership of the Georgia House of Representatives, a relatively low figure.

Officers

The House of Representatives elects its own Speaker as well as a Speaker Pro Tempore. Speaker Jon G. Burns was elected on January 9, 2023.  Speaker Pro Tempore Jan Jones, who served as Speaker after the passing of Speaker David Ralston, was reelected to her previous position on that day as well. The Speaker Pro Tempore becomes Speaker in case of the death, resignation, or permanent disability of the Speaker. The Speaker Pro Tempore serves until a new Speaker is elected. In addition there is a Clerk of the House, who is charged with overseeing the flow of legislation through the body.  The current clerk is William L. Reilly.

Source:

Membership

List of current representatives
, the membership of the House is as follows:

Longest serving representatives
The following is a list of the 10 individuals who served the longest amount of time in the Georgia House of Representatives.

Committees list 
Source:

 Agriculture and Consumer Affairs
 Appropriations
 Banks and Banking
 Budget & Fiscal Affairs Oversight
 Code Revision
 Defense and Veterans Affairs
 Economic Development and Tourism
 Education
 Ethics
 Energy, Utilities and Telecommunications
 Game, Fish, and Parks
 Governmental Affairs
 Health and Human Services
 Higher Education
 Human Relations and Aging
 Industry and Labor
 Information and Audits
 Insurance
 Intergovernmental Coordination
 Interstate Cooperation
 Judiciary
 Judiciary – Non-Civil
 Juvenile Justice
 Legislative and Congressional Reapportionment
 MARTOC—Metropolitan Atlanta Rapid Transit Overview Committee. Senate/House joint committee. Provides oversight of the Metro Atlanta Rapid Transit Authority (MARTA).
 Motor Vehicles
 Natural Resources and Environment
 Public Safety and Homeland Security
 Regulated Industries
 Retirement
 Rules
 Science and Technology
 Small Business Development
 Special Rules
 State Planning and Community Affairs
 State Properties
 Transportation
 Ways and Means

See also

 155th Georgia General Assembly (2019–2021)
 154th Georgia General Assembly (2017–2018)
 153rd Georgia General Assembly (2015–2016)
 152nd Georgia General Assembly (2013–2014)
 151st Georgia General Assembly (2011–2012)
 150th Georgia General Assembly (2009–2010)
 149th Georgia General Assembly (2007–2008)
 148th Georgia General Assembly (2005–2006)
 147th Georgia General Assembly (2003–2004)
 146th Georgia General Assembly (2001–2002)
 145th Georgia General Assembly (1999–2000)
 144th Georgia General Assembly (1997–1998)
 143rd Georgia General Assembly (1995–1996)
 142nd Georgia General Assembly (1993–1994)
 140th Georgia General Assembly (1989–1990)
 139th Georgia General Assembly (1987–1988)
 138th Georgia General Assembly (1985–1986)
 137th Georgia General Assembly (1983–1984)
 136th Georgia General Assembly (1981–1982)
 135th Georgia General Assembly (1979–1980)
 134th Georgia General Assembly (1977–1979)
 Georgia State Senate

Explanatory notes

References

External links
 List of House of Representatives

Georgia General Assembly
State lower houses in the United States